Bill Wilson (born 1948) is the founder and senior pastor of Metro World Child, America's largest ministry to children with branches in various nations. He is a well-known speaker, author, pastor and advocate for poor, inner city children all over the world.

Biography
When Bill Wilson was 12 years, his mother abandoned him on a street corner in Pinellas Park, Florida. She said, "I can't do this anymore. You wait here, I will be back." Bill stayed on that street corner for three days, but his mother never came back. Dave Rudenis, a local mechanic and committed Christian, found him there and took him to his home. Rudenis offered to pay this young man's way to a Christian summer camp. It was during this camp that the 12-year-old Wilson committed his life to God. While he was a teenager, young Bill Wilson was given a job at his local congregation. After his high school graduation, Wilson was encouraged to attend a seminary. He studied at Southeastern University and obtained a degree in theology.

Ministry
Bill Wilson returned to his home church and pioneered one of the first bus ministries in the United States. Each week, Wilson and his team picked up thousands of children from the projects of St. Petersburg, Florida and presented a weekly program that included games, music, puppets and a weekly message. After years of success in Florida, Bill Wilson was invited by Tommy Barnett to replicate this ministry in Davenport, Iowa. Within four years, Barnett and Wilson helped create one of the largest Protestant churches in America.

In 1979, Bill Wilson moved to one of the roughest areas of Brooklyn, New York – Bushwick.  In 1980, armed with a bull horn, a station wagon and Yogi Bear costumes, Bill created Metro World Child (formerly Metro Ministries). Once again, Wilson's concept of a bus ministry became extremely successful. Even with multiple weekend services, his congregation outgrew the former brewery that serves as his church in Bushwick.  With no more room to house any new visitors to his Church, Wilson decided to take his Church to the streets. In 1988, he created the idea of a Sidewalk Sunday School, in which he converted trucks to serve as portable stages from whence his team of ministers could share their message. This concept became highly successful and these collective congregations now number more than 250 000 children in attendance each week globally in 12 countries. 

Word of Bill Wilson's success in New York spread to other Churches and inner city ministries. The concept of a bus ministry and Sidewalk Sunday School has now been replicated in cities and towns all over the world. In an attempt to remain in touch with the people attending his congregation, Bill Wilson still lives in a building with the rest of the staff and Interns. He continues to walk through the often dangerous neighborhoods of Bushwick in an effort to carry on his work. Over the years, Wilson has been shot, stabbed, beaten and hospitalized numerous times and is adept at raising millions of dollars for the ministry telling stories of hardship. Yet he remains committed to the work. Bill Wilson still drives one of the hundreds of buses utilized by his ministry each week, when he is in town.

Metro World Child in Bushwick, Brooklyn is the largest Sunday school program in America, reaching an average of more than 220 000 children aged 12 and under each week. The curriculum that Wilson designed is used in over 1,000 cities around the world. In 1992, Wilson was the only ghetto resident appointed to President George H. W. Bush's National Commission on America's Urban Families. On Sunday, December 16, 2007, television pastor Joel Osteen of Lakewood Church in Houston, Texas talked about Bill Wilson's story in his nationally televised program. 

Wilson is the author of several books, including The Blind Guide Chronicles, Christianity in the Crosshairs, One Eyed Kings and his bestselling autobiography, Whose Child is This? His newest book, entitled Elephants of Relevance were released in Taiwan on the 18 February 2019. In addition, Wilson is a popular speaker who travels extensively around the world in an effort to raise funds for his Non Profit and mission in Brooklyn, New York. He has been a featured guest at numerous conferences, television talk shows and news programs and in Churches around the world.

Bibliography

 Bill Wilson, "Whose Child is This?" Florida: Charisma House, c1992. 
 Bill Wilson, "Blind Guide Chronicles, Vol. III: Daily Challenges from the Life Experiences of Bill Wilson."  New York: Metro Ministries, 2003.  
 Bill Wilson, "Christianity in the Crosshairs: Real Life Solutions Discovered in the Line of Fire." Pennsylvania: Destiny Image Publishers, c2004. 
 Bill Wilson, "One-Eyed Kings." New York: Metro Ministries, c2008. 
 Bill Wilson, "The Teflon Rhino: Navigating the Jungle of Real Life (without getting stomped to death)." New York: Metro Ministries, c2010. 
 Bill Wilson, "Running with Turtles." New York: Metro World Child, c2014.  
 Bill Wilson, "Elephants of Relevance: Deal with the Elephants in Your Room or You'll End Up in the Wrong Zoo." New York: Metro World Child, c2019.

References

External links
 Metro World Child website
 Review of Bill Wilson's Book "Whose Child is This?

1948 births
Living people
Clergy from Boston
American Protestant missionaries
Christian writers
American male writers
Protestant missionaries in the United States